Awake: The Life of Yogananda is a 2014 documentary about the Indian yogi and guru Paramahansa Yogananda who came to the West in the 1920s to teach yoga and meditation. The film is in English with subtitles in seventeen languages.

The film, directed by Paola di Florio and Lisa Leeman who are independent American filmmakers, was commissioned by Yogananda's Self-Realization Fellowship. It includes interviews with disciples of Paramahansa Yogananda, as well as with Ravi Shankar, George Harrison, Krishna Das, and others. It was filmed over three years with the participation of thirty countries, including on pilgrimages in India, at Harvard Divinity School and its physics labs, the Center for Science and Spirituality at the University of Pennsylvania, and the Chopra Center in Carlsbad, California.

Awards 
 Winner of the Audience Award for Best Film at the Illuminate Film Festival 
 Winner Maui Film Festival, Spirit in Cinema Award
 Winner Conscious Life Award, Conscious Life Expo Film Festival
 Official Selection Seattle International Film Festival
 Official Selection Tel Aviv Spirit Film Festival
 Herat International Women's Film Festival, Afghanistan

See also
 Autobiography of a Yogi, 1946 book
 Arise, awake, and stop not till the goal is reached, Vivekananda

References

External links 

 
 Awake: The Life of Yogananda, Official Website
 Awake: The Life of Yogananda, Official Trailer 
 Facebook
 Film Festival Openings

Paramahansa Yogananda
2014 documentary films
2014 films
American documentary films
Documentary films about Hinduism
2010s English-language films
2010s American films